The Kampung River is a river in southern Papua province, Indonesia. It is a tributary of the Pulau River.

Geography
The river flows in the southern area of Papua with predominantly tropical rainforest climate (designated as Af in the Köppen-Geiger climate classification). The annual average temperature in the area is 23 °C. The warmest month is December, when the average temperature is around 25 °C, and the coldest is July, at 20 °C. The average annual rainfall is 5547 mm. The wettest month is May, with an average of 594 mm rainfall, and the driest is July, with 384 mm rainfall.

See also
List of rivers of Indonesia
List of rivers of Western New Guinea

References

Rivers of South Papua
Rivers of Indonesia